"(The Best Part of) Breakin' Up" is a song written by Phil Spector, Pete Andreoli and Vince Poncia.  It was first recorded by the Ronettes, produced by Phil Spector and arranged by Jack Nitzsche with Ronnie Spector on lead vocals and with backing vocals by Nedra Talley and Estelle Bennett, ably abetted by Darlene Love and the Blossoms, Bobby Sheen (a.k.a. Bob B. Soxx), and Sonny & Cher. The song was released in April 1964, the year widely recognized as the group's most successful year, and proved to be the group's third consecutive top forty hit in the US.  The single peaked at number 39 on the U.S. Billboard Hot 100 and number 43 on the UK Singles Chart.

Original recording

With the British invasion in full force during 1964, many of the previous American groups from the late 1950s/early 1960s found their popularity beginning to seriously wane.  For the Ronettes, however, 1964 proved to be their biggest year. While none of their singles matched the success of their 1963 classic "Be My Baby", the group released four songs, all of which reached the top forty on the Billboard Charts in the US. Before making "(The Best Part of) Breakin' Up," their previous single had been the successful "Baby, I Love You", which peaked at number twenty-four on the Billboard charts.

However, according to Ronnie Spector, the group's lead singer, producer Phil Spector had already begun to somewhat lose enthusiasm for the Ronettes in early 1964.  The group had recorded the Phil Spector, Jeff Barry, and Ellie Greenwich song "Chapel of Love" in early 1964, but Spector refused to release it. "It doesn't sound like a hit,"  he told the group, so The Dixie Cups recorded their version of the song, which peaked at number one on the Billboard top 100, a position never held by the Ronettes.

After losing out on "Chapel of Love" the Ronettes went to work on "(The Best Part of) Breakin' Up." According to Ronnie Spector, Phil Spector was especially enthusiastic about the song.  "When Phil loved a song as much as he loved "(The Best Part of) Breakin' Up," she later wrote in her autobiography, "he could work on it for days without ever getting tired. He spent hours working out the harmonies with Nedra and Estelle, then he'd jump up and down every time he heard something he liked."

Billboard said of the song that "The gals swing in with a stompin' rock ballad that has that the famous Spector sound."  Billboard described the song as having a "smash sound" and praised the lead vocal and arrangement  Cash Box described it as "a tantalizing shuffle-thumper that the gals knock out with loads of teen appeal" with a "stand out, percussion-led rock-a-rhythmic arrangement" by Jack Nitzsche.
"(The Best Part of) Breakin' Up" proved to be a hit for the Ronettes, though it did not achieve the success of their previous two singles. The song is  remembered in the US for being the influence for Folgers advertising campaign "The best part of waking up, is Folgers in your cup," a slogan the company has used since 1984.

Chart history

Cover versions
The song was a no. 25 UK Singles Chart hit for The Symbols in 1968.

In 1982, American singer Roni Griffith hit number two on the US Dance Club Songs chart for two weeks with her Hi-NRG version of the song, produced by American record producer Bobby Orlando.

The Devil Dogs covered the song on their eponymous debut album in 1989.

References

External links
 

1964 songs
1964 singles
1982 singles
The Ronettes songs
Song recordings produced by Phil Spector
Songs written by Phil Spector
Songs written by Vini Poncia
Philles Records singles
President Records singles
American dance-pop songs